Joan Morrissey was a Newfoundland-Canadian singer.

Born in St. John's, Newfoundland on January 23, 1935, she was one of ten children.  Entering the workforce at only thirteen years of age, she quickly moved up in the music industry of her home province of Newfoundland.  Starting in the early 1960s, she began her career as a singer hosting and singing on local radio programs on CJON, VOCM, and CBC Radio.

Death
Though the events that culminated in her suicide are not certain, Joan had undergone open heart surgery in October 1977 which left scarring on her chest and legs.  It was subsequently reported that she had been severely depressed since her operation and took her own life on January 10, 1978, at her home in Mount Pearl, Newfoundland.

Acclaim
With the success of her fourth album, "Home Brew" selling 50,000 copies, and reaching gold status, Joan received honorary awards from the Newfoundland Easter Seals, followed in 1972 by a Juno nomination.  As well in the same year she was awarded Newfoundland's Musical Ambassador of Good Will by the Provincial Government. Many her of songs are an homage to Newfoundland lifestyle and are still heard on Canadian radio stations today.  Some of her most notable songs include "Thank God We're Surrounded by Water", and "CN Bus".  A recently published biography, Yes My Dear..., was nominated for the 2005 Heritage and History Award for Newfoundland and Labrador.

Discography

Footnotes

External links
 Yes My Dear... The Life and Times of Joan Morrissey
 Joan Morrissey – Encyclopedia of Newfoundland and Labrador, v. 3, p. 627

1935 births
1978 suicides
Canadian women folk singers
Canadian folk singers
Musicians from St. John's, Newfoundland and Labrador
20th-century Canadian women singers
Suicides in Canada